Albert Moss may refer to:

Albert Moss (cricketer)
DJ Uncle Al, real name Albert Moss, Miami DJ

See also
Albert Mosse, German judge and legal scholar